St. Joseph's PU College, Anekal, India, was founded by the Society of Jesus in 2010 in Anekal town, a suburb of Bangalore. It offers two years of pre-university education to an underserved rural population. A feeder school is the Jesuit St. Joseph School, Anekal less than 2 kilometers away.

In 2015 there were 542 students studying in both I and II PU in different streams: PCMB, PCMC, HEBA, CEBA and HEPS. There are a total of 28 staff members.

Hindu activists have attacked the students and administrators three times, with seeming impunity under the BJP government in Karnataka. The student body consists of 60% Dalit Hindus with the remainder Christians and Muslims.

See also
 List of Jesuit sites

References  

Jesuit universities and colleges in India
Universities and colleges in Bangalore
Pre University colleges in Karnataka
Educational institutions established in 2010
2010 establishments in Karnataka